Bye Bye 17 is the fifth solo studio album by Har Mar Superstar. It was released via Cult Records on April 23, 2013. It peaked at number 15 on the Billboard Heatseekers Albums chart. Music videos were created for "Lady, You Shot Me", "Prisoner", and "Restless Leg".

Production
Most of the songs on Bye Bye 17 were written in 2011 after Har Mar Superstar moved from Los Angeles to New York City. It is the first Har Mar Superstar album that he wrote primarily on guitar. He said, "I wanted the album to sound really live, old, and futuristic." In concert, he developed the material from the album. Recorded at Public Hi-Fi in Austin, Texas, it was co-produced with Jim Eno.

Critical reception

At Metacritic, which assigns a weighted average score out of 100 to reviews from mainstream critics, the album received an average score of 60% based on 10 reviews, indicating "mixed or average reviews".

Gregory Heaney of AllMusic gave the album 3.5 stars out of 5, calling it "an album of straight-up soul-pop that once again shows that beneath his greasy exterior, Har Mar Superstar has the heart of a soul man."

Track listing

Charts

References

External links
 

2013 albums
Har Mar Superstar albums
Cult Records albums